The Morocco national under-18 football team is the national representative for Morocco in international under-18 football competition, and is controlled by the Royal Moroccan Football Federation. The team competes in the Mediterranean Games, which is held every four years. The under-18 team also participates in local and international friendly tournaments.

Current squad
 The following players were called up for the Football at the 2022 Mediterranean Games.

 Match dates: 26 June – 5 July 2022
 Caps and goals correct as of:''' 26 June 2022

See also 
 Morocco national football team
 Morocco national under-23 football team
 Morocco national under-20 football team
 Morocco national under-17 football team
 Football at the Mediterranean Games

References

External links 

under-18
African national under-18 association football teams
Youth football in Morocco